Konstantinos Kaznaferis (born 22 June 1987) is a Greek former professional footballer who played as a midfielder.

Kaznaferis began his playing career by signing with Anagennisi Arta in 2004.

Career

Angennisi Arta
Kaznaferis began his professional career in Anagennisi Artas. He played in his birthplace team from 2004 to 2006. In this 2 years, Kostas appeared in 29 matches and scored one goal. His appearances with Anagennisi were enough to pull interesting by many teams in Greece.

PAS Giannina
Kaznaferis has two spells with PAS Giannina. In his first one, he played in Ajax of Epirus by 2006 to 2008. His appearances with PAS Giannina made him one of the biggest talents of Epirus. In his first spell, Kostas made 39 appearances, he scored 1 goal and he made a lot of assists. In his second spell to PAS Giannina (2009-2010), Kaznaferis continued great performances and big teams were looking him. In this spell, he made about 10 appearances and scored 1 goal.

Pyrsos Grevenon (loan)
In 2009-2010 first half of season, Kaznaferis went on loan to Pyrsos Grevena, a team in Greek Gamma Ethniki. He made 13 appearances without scoring, and he never persuaded Pyrsos for signing him. As a result, he returned quickly to PAS Giannina.

Aris
His vindication came in summer of 2010. Aris, one of the biggest teams in Greece, made an offer to sign him. In his first season to Theesaloniki, Kaznaferis made a little performances, playing at many positions and not giving good performances. 2011–2012 season was Kaznaferis's best season of his career. By then, he has established as basic and irreplaceable right back of Aris, giving incredible performances and he stands out for his passion.

Lokomotiv Plovdiv
Kaznaferis continued his career at Lokomotiv Plovdiv. It is important to mention that the Bulgarian team coach was Hristo Bonev, who had a remarkable career in the Superleague Greece for AEK, besides the fact that he served as a coach of Panathinaikos, AEL and Ionikos. He made his debut at 26 September in an away loss against Lovech.

Platanias
Kaznaferis did not manage to incorporate to his environment, therefore he initially managed to return to his previous club Aris, but due to financial and administrative problems, he finally decided to join Platanias. As a consequence, he returned to Superleague Greece and he made his debut with his new club on 20 January 2014, in a 2–0 home loss against OFI.

Ergotelis
Kaznaferis signed a contract with fellow Cretan Superleague club Ergotelis on 28 July 2014. He made a total of 23 appearances for the club in the season.

Aris
On 13 September 2015, Kaznaferis resigned for Aris.

Later career
On 19 September 2019, Kaznaferis joined Almopos Aridaea. In January 2020, Kaznaferis returned to Anagennisi Arta.

References

External links
 

1987 births
Living people
Greek footballers
Greek expatriate footballers
Anagennisi Arta F.C. players
PAS Giannina F.C. players
Aris Thessaloniki F.C. players
Ergotelis F.C. players
PFC Lokomotiv Plovdiv players
Panegialios F.C. players
Iraklis Thessaloniki F.C. players
Super League Greece players
First Professional Football League (Bulgaria) players
Expatriate footballers in Bulgaria
Association football wingers
Association football fullbacks
Footballers from Arta, Greece